Marie Tomášová (born 18 April 1929) is a Czech film and stage actress. At the 2008 Thalia Awards she won the category of lifetime achievement in drama. She studied at the Faculty of Theatre (Prague). Tomášová acted at the National Theatre in Prague between 1955 and 1965. She was married to theatre director Otomar Krejča.

Selected filmography
Anna Proletářka (1953)
The Strakonice Bagpiper (1955)
September Nights (1957)
That Kind of Love (1959)
První parta (1959)
Čarodějky z předměstí (1991)

References

External links

1929 births
Living people
Czech film actresses
Czechoslovak film actresses
Czech stage actresses
Czechoslovak stage actresses
People from Dobrovice
20th-century Czech actresses
21st-century Czech actresses
Recipients of the Thalia Award